Dental prosthetist may refer to:

 Dental technician, a person who makes dentures
 Denturist or clinical dental technician, a person who makes dentures and fits them to patients 
 Prosthodontist, a certified Dental Specialist (Dentist with additional training in removable prostheses ("dentures") and oral rehabilitations)